Chip Ferguson is a former American football quarterback who played one season with the Tampa Bay Storm of the Arena Football League. He played college football at Florida State University.

References

External links
Just Sports Stats
College stats

Living people
Players of American football from South Carolina
American football quarterbacks
Florida State Seminoles football players
Tampa Bay Storm players
Sportspeople from Spartanburg, South Carolina
1967 births